Scott Woodward may refer to:

Scott Woodward (athletic director), collegiate athletic director
Scott Woodward (biologist), microbiologist and molecular biologist